Purpose is the debut album by contemporary R&B singer, Algebra. It stayed on the Billboard Top R&B/Hip-Hop Albums chart for 14 weeks, peaking at No. 56.

Track listing
 At This Time 
 Halfway 
 Run and Hide 
 U Do It for Me 
 ABC's 1, 2, 3's (Interlude)/Happy After 
 My Pride 
 Holla Back (Interlude)/Simple Complication 
 What Happened? 
 No Idea 
 Tug of War 
 Can I Keep U? 
 I Think I Love U 
 Come Back 
 Now & Then 
 Where R We Now

References

Contemporary R&B albums by American artists
2008 debut albums
Neo soul albums